The following are the national records in athletics in the Netherlands maintained by its national athletics federation: Atletiekunie.

Outdoor 

Key to tables:

+ = en route to a longer distance

h = hand timing

A = affected by altitude

Mx = mixed competition

NWI = no wind measurement

X = annulled due doping violation or to no doping control

Men

Women

Mixed

Indoor

Men

Women

Notes

References
General
Dutch Men Outdoor Records (track) 1 February 2023 updated
Dutch Women Outdoor Records (track) 1 February 2023 updated
Dutch Mixed Relay Outdoor Records (track) 22 December 2021 updated
Dutch Men Road Records 1 February 2023 updated
Dutch Women Road Records 1 February 2023 updated
Dutch Men Indoor Records 1 February 2023 updated
Dutch Women Indoor Records 1 February 2023 updated
Specific

External links 
 Atletiekunie web site

Dutch
Athletics
Records
Athletics